The Diamond Mountains are a mountain range along the border of Eureka and White Pine Counties, in northern Nevada, Western United States.

Geography
The range separates Newark Valley from Diamond Valley.

The southeastern Diamond Mountains angle southwest to meet the Fish Creek Range, and the adjacent Mountain Boy Range.

The flora and fauna are typical of higher elevation habitats in the Central Basin and Range ecoregion.

Access
The town of Eureka lies between the three ranges, with unimproved roads north across Diamond Valley to access the western flank of the range. Southeast from Eureka, U.S. 50 crosses the southern Diamond Mountains, and turns eastward at the range's south end.

Nevada State Route 892 follows the eastern flank foothills for half the range's length. The route then becomes an unimproved road north past the range, then through Huntington Valley to meet Nevada State Route 228 and Elko.

See also

 List of mountain ranges of Nevada

References

 Nevada Atlas & Gazetteer, 2001, pgs. 39 and 47

External links

Mountain ranges of Nevada
Mountain ranges of White Pine County, Nevada
Mountain ranges of Eureka County, Nevada